Psilogramma hainanensis is a moth of the  family Sphingidae which is endemic to Hainan, China.

References

Psilogramma
Moths described in 2001
Endemic fauna of Hainan
Insects of China